Bukit Tinggi Medical Centre (formerly known as Manipal Hospitals Klang) is a modern private medical facility located in Bandar Bukit Tinggi, Klang, Selangor, Malaysia. Bukit Tinggi Medical Centre (BTMC) is a part of the Ramsay Sime Darby Healthcare (RSDH), a joint venture between Ramsay Health Care, Australia and Sime Darby, Malaysia. Earlier it was part of the Manipal Hospitals, India.

History 
In August 2013, Manipal Hospitals acquired the former 72-bed Arunamari Specialist Medical Centre in Klang, Selangor. The US$100 million acquisition by Manipal Hospitals also included a new 220-bed tertiary care hospital project in Bandar Bukit Tinggi, Klang.

A modern medical facility built on a 0.85-hectare site, the Manipal Hospitals Klang (MHK) project was implemented in accordance with the Malaysian health care guidelines, MSQHA and also Joint Commission International (JCI).

In November 2021, RSDH acquired MHK and rebranded it as BTMC.

Hospital facilities 
Fully operational since 18 July 2016, Manipal Hospitals Klang (MHK) has a twin 5-storey medical towers with a built-up area of 362,000 sq ft and over 300 car park bays. The hospital provides 24-hour emergency services, diagnostic, surgical, interventional and rehabilitative services including super specialities such as cardiothoracic, neurology and paediatric surgeries, nephrology, vascular and plastic surgeries, cardiology, diabetes and endocrinology, gastroenterology, dental, trauma and critical care, orthopaedics, nose and throat surgery, obstetrics and gynaecology, urology, dermatology and ophthalmology. Each of these departments will be a centre of excellence.

As of July 2016, Manipal Hospitals Klang (MHK) has a team of over 300 nursing staff and 60 resident and visiting specialists, and it has a state-of-the-art trauma centre and emergency medicine services led by trauma specialist. The hospital also has a full-fledged catheterisation laboratory (cath lab), computerised tomography (CT) scan, magnetic resonance imaging (MRI) scan, bone dual-energy x-ray absorptiometry (DEXA) scan, fluoroscopy and a one-stop health screening, occupational medicine and wellness centre.

Gallery

See also
 Healthcare in Malaysia

References

External links 
 Ministry of Health, Malaysia
 Klang District Health Office, Malaysia

Hospitals in Selangor
Teaching hospitals in Malaysia
Hospitals established in 1999
Hospitals established in 2016
1999 establishments in Malaysia
Klang (city)